Wu Dingmao (Chinese: 吴丁卯; born 13 April 1987 in Dalian) is a Chinese football player.

Club career
In 2009, Wu Dingmao started his professional football career with Panjin Mengzun in the China League Two. In 2011, Wu transferred to China League Two side Harbin Yiteng. In the 2011 China League Two campaign he would be part of the team that won the division and promotion into the second tier.

In 2012, He moved to China League Two side Shanxi Jiayi on a one-year loan deal.
In 2013, He moved to China League Two side Hebei Zhongji on a one-year loan deal.

In 2014, Wu transferred to Chinese Super League side Guizhou Renhe.  On 22 April 2014, he made his debut for Guizhou Renhe in the 2014 AFC Champions League against Western Sydney Wanderers, coming on as a substitute for Shen Tianfeng in the 76th minute.
In June 2016, Wu was loaned to China League Two side Shenyang Urban until 31 December 2016.

Career statistics 
Statistics accurate as of match played 31 December 2020.

Honours

Club
Harbin Yiteng
 China League Two: 2011

References

External links

1987 births
Living people
Chinese footballers
Footballers from Dalian
Zhejiang Yiteng F.C. players
Inner Mongolia Zhongyou F.C. players
Hebei F.C. players
Beijing Renhe F.C. players
Chinese Super League players
China League One players
Association football midfielders
21st-century Chinese people